Ali Rıza Öreroğlu, MD (is a Turkish/Persian plastic, reconstructive and aesthetic surgeon. Acknowledged for his work in facial rejuvenation and rhinoplasty.

Early life and education
Born to a Turkish father and a Persian mother, Öreroğlu has finished his primary education in Tehran. He has graduated from Ankara University Faculty of Medicine as a medical doctor in 2006 and completed his specialty education at the Department of Plastic, Reconstructive and Aesthetic Surgery of Istanbul Okmeydanı Training and Research Hospital and has become a specialist in plastic surgery in 2012.

Career 
Öreroğlu has served as an observer fellow at PACES plastic surgery clinic of Atlanta Georgia, USA with Dr. Foad Nahai in 2009. He has achieved the International Aesthetic Surgery Fellowship scholarship program of the American Society of Aesthetic Plastic Surgery (ASAPS).

He has worked at Dr. Ilhan Özdemir State Hospital in Giresun, Turkey and Acıbadem Fulya Hospital as Assistant professor of plastic surgery. In November 2016, he has founded Dr. Öreroğlu Aesthetic Clinic in Nişantaşı, Istanbul.

Research work

Among his scientific publications, Öreroğlu's work about surgical techniques on rhinoplasty has been notable. Öreroğlu is known as a fellow and board certified member of the Turkish Society of Plastic Reconstructive and Aesthetic Surgery; the Turkish Aesthetic Plastic Surgery Society; the European Board of Plastic, Reconstructive and Aesthetic Surgery; the International Society of Plastic Surgery and the American Society of Plastic Surgeons.

Awards
Second prize in the clinic category of the Proclamation Competition at the 33rd National Congress of the Society of Turkish Plastic Reconstructive and Aesthetic Surgery in 2011.

Observer fellowship grant to the International Aesthetic Surgery Fellowship program of the American Society of Aesthetic Plastic Surgery (ASAPS) 2013.

Selected publications

Concentric-needle cannula method for single-puncture arthrocentesis in temporomandibular joint disease: an inexpensive and feasible technique. Öreroğlu AR, Özkaya Ö, Öztürk MB, Bingöl D, Akan M. J Oral Maxillofac Surg. 2011 Sep;69(9):2334-8.
Isolated congenital partial absence of the left lower lateral nasal cartilage: case report. Asfuroğlu Barutca S, Öreroğlu AR, Usçetin I, Kutlu N. Ann Plast Surg. 2011 Dec;67(6):662-4.
A Suggestion for the Preoperative Checklist of Plastic Surgery Operations. Öreroğlu AR, Üsçetin İ, Aksan T, Orman Ç, Akan M. Turk Plast Surg. 2011 Sep/Dec;19(3):151-2.
Contemporary Perforator Flap Variations Their Applications. Öreroğlu AR, Üsçetin İ, Barutca S, Orman Ç, Karahangil M, Akan M. Okmeydani Tip Derg. 2012 Jan;28(1):1-7.
Coexistent Cutaneous Tuberous and Tendinous Xanthomas in Traumatic Regions: A Case Report. Öreroğlu AR, Üsçetin İ, Egemen O, Öztürk MB, Asfuroğlu S, Tatlıdede HS. Eur J Plast Surg. 2012 Apr;35(4):325-327.
Rhinoplasty: A Complete Subperichondrial Dissection with Management of the Nasal Ligaments. Çakır B, Öreroğlu AR, Doğan T, Akan M. Aesthet Surg J. 2012 Jul;32(5):564-74.
Ocular Complication After Trichloroacetic Acid Peeling: A Case Report. Öztürk MB, Özkaya Ö, Karahangil M, Çekic O, Öreroğlu AR, Akan M. Aesth Plast Surg. 2013 Feb;37(1):56–59.
Rhinoplasty: Surface Aesthetics and Surgical Techniques. Çakır B, Doğan T, Öreroğlu AR, Daniel RK. Aesthet Surg J. 2013 Mar;33(3):363-75.
Triphalangeal Thumb with Polydactyly: An Alternative Surgical Method. Öztürk MB, Gönüllü E, Öreroğlu AR, Üsçetin İ, Basat SO, Akan M. J Hand Microsurg. 2013 Jun;5(1):20-23.
The Use of Acellular Dermal Matrix in treatment of Mitten Hand in Epidermolysis Bullosa Patients. Özkaya Ö, Öreroğlu AR, Akan M. J Hand Microsurg. 2013 Jun;5(1):46-47.
How Much Do We Know About The Venous Thromboembolism? The Approach Of Turkish Plastic Surgeons To The Venous Thromboembolism Prophylaxis And Preferred Methods In Prophylaxis: A Survey Study. Özkaya Ö, Öztürk MB, Egemen O, Öreroğlu AR, Üsçetin İ, Tasasız K, Akan M. Turk Plast Surg. 2013;21(2):10-15.
Concurrent repair of orbital shallowness with craniosynostosis surgery: two late cases of simultaneous orbital decompression. Öreroğlu AR, Silav G, Özkaya Ö, Orman Ç, Akan M. Turk Neurosurg. 2013;23(3):395-400.
Bone Dust and Diced Cartilage Combined with Blood Glue: A Practical Technique for Dorsum Enhancement. Öreroğlu AR, Çakır B, Akan M. Aesthetic Plast Surg. 2014 Feb;38(1):90-4.
Transient Leg Paralysis After Abdominal Liposuction. Öreroğlu AR. Aesthet Surg J. 2014 Jan 1;34(1):193-4.
The Sandwiched Lateral Crural Reinforcement Graft: A Novel Technique for Lateral Crus Reinforcement in Rhinoplasty. Kuran I, Öreroğlu AR. Aesthet Surg J. 2014 Mar;34(3):383-93.
Surface Aesthetics in Tip Rhinoplasty: Step-by-Step Surgery. Çakır B, Öreroğlu AR, Daniel RK. Aesthet Surg J. 2014 Jun 16;34(6):941-955.
The Lateral Crural Rein Falp: A Novel Technique For Management Of Tip Rotation In Primary Rhinoplasty. Kuran İ, Öreroğlu AR, Efendioğlu K. Aesthet Surg J. 2014 Sep;34(7):1008-17.
Saphenous Vein Sparing Superficial Inguinal Dissection in Lower Extremity Melanoma. Öztürk MB, Akan A, Özkaya Ö, Egemen O, Öreroğlu AR, Kayadibi T, Akan M. J Skin Cancer. 2014.
Response to "Comments on 'The Lateral Crural Rein Flap: A Novel Technique for Management of Tip Rotation in Primary Rhinoplasty'. Kuran İ, Öreroğlu AR, Efendioğlu K. Aesthet Surg J. 2015 Jul;35(5).
Recurrent Ameloblastoma in the Free Fibula Flap: Review of Literature and an Unusual Case Report. Basat SO, Öreroğlu AR, Orman Ç, Aksan T, Üsçetin İ, Akan M. J. Maxillofac. Oral Surg. 2015 Sep;14(3):821-5.
An Unusual Deadly Craniofacial Trauma Due to Hot Liquid Plastic Infusion. Basat SO, Öreroğlu AR, etc. J Craniofac Surg. 2015 Oct;26(7):e666-7.
Surface Aesthetics and Analysis. Çakır B, Öreroğlu AR, Daniel RK. Clin Plast Surg. 2016 Jan;43(1):1-15.
Osteoectomy in Rhinoplasty: A New Concept in Nasal Bones Repositioning. Çakır B, Finocchi V, Tambasco D, Öreroğlu AR, Doğan T. Ann Plast Surg. 2016 June;76(6):622-8.

References

External links

Living people
Physicians from Tehran
1981 births
Turkish plastic surgeons
Ankara University alumni
Iranian surgeons
Iranian people of Turkish descent